Ajjada is a village in Balijipeta mandal, Parvathipuram Manyam district of Andhra Pradesh, India. It has a population of 2,700 with male:female ratio of 1:1 and 40% literacy rate.

Eminent people
It is the birthplace of Telugu Harikatha Pithamahaa Ajjada Adibhatla Narayana Dasu.

References 

Villages in Parvathipuram Manyam district